Alilu may refer to:
Alilu, Armenia
Alilu, Iran